Bucculatrix ussurica is a moth in the family Bucculatricidae. It was described by Svetlana Seksjaeva in 1996. It is found in Russia.

References

Natural History Museum Lepidoptera generic names catalog

Bucculatricidae
Moths described in 1996
Moths of Asia